Pyrausta peyrieralis is a moth in the family Crambidae. It was described by Viette in 1978. It is found in Madagascar.

References

Moths described in 1978
peyrieralis
Moths of Madagascar